Karl Anthony Green (born 31 July 1947) is an English songwriter, musician and bassist who was the bass guitarist and backing singer for the 1960s British band, Herman's Hermits.

Biography 
Herman's Hermits consisted of Peter Noone (lead vocals), Green (bass), Keith Hopwood (rhythm guitar), Derek "Lek" Leckenby (lead guitar), and Barry Whitwam (drums).

Green was in Herman's Hermits from its first formation as the Heartbeats in 1963, then renamed Herman and The Hermits, and finally on 1 April 1964, the group changed its name to Herman's Hermits. Green wrote Busy Line and Moonshine Man on the Blaze album, among others. When Peter Noone left the group in 1974, Green took over lead vocals. Green left the band in 1980, to pursue a life outside of music.

On VH1's My Generation: Herman's Hermits episode, Green spoke fondly of his early days with Peter Noone, and of his admiration for their guitarist Derek "Lek" Leckenby.

In 2015, Green once again began performing live concerts. His band, Karl Green Band, includes longtime professional musicians Mike Bruccoleri (bass) and Gina Knight (drums).

The Karl Green Band released their 12-track debut album, The Long Road Back, on 1 March 2016. This was Green's first solo endeavour, since retiring from Herman's Hermits. The final track on the album entitled The Renshaw Shuffle, was composed and recorded in 1977.  Besides Green, the track also features Derek "Lek" Lekenby.

The Karl Green Band released its second album, Evergreen on 5 October 2017 and Heavenly on 21 November 2018. All tracks are co-written by Green and his songwriting partner, Tony Kemp.

References

External links
 '' The Karl Green Band Official Website (Archived)

Living people
English bass guitarists
English male guitarists
Male bass guitarists
English songwriters
Herman's Hermits members
People from Davyhulme
Beat musicians
British male songwriters
1947 births